Splash is an American reality competition series broadcast on ABC, based on the Celebrity Splash! format created by Dutch company Eyeworks. It premiered on March 19, 2013. Steve Foley and David Boudia are judges while Greg Louganis mentored the competitors.

Production history 
The series was first mentioned on October 5, 2012, when it was announced that ABC ordered what was called Celebrity Splash straight to series. Based on the Dutch series of the same name, it has celebrities perform dives from extreme heights and each week the challenges increase in difficulty.

Eight out of ten of the cast were revealed on January 25, 2013, which is also when the series changed its name to its current title of Splash. The two unrevealed cast members were revealed on February 4, 2013.  The final two to be revealed were Nicole Eggert and Rory Bushfield.  The hosts for season one have been Joey Lawrence and Charissa Thompson.

Season 1 was filmed at the Riverside Aquatics Complex on the campus of Riverside City College.

Cast

Injuries 
 On March 26, 2013 (Week 2), Chuy Bravo withdrew the competition with an injury to his heel. Brandi Chastain replaced Bravo after the injury.
 Rory Bushfield suffered a ruptured eardrum in practice in Week 3. He had to go to four doctors before one would clear him to continue.
 Katherine Webb suffered a back injury and withdrew from the show.
 Reportedly Nicole Eggert was injured in the third week of April during a taping of the show.
 During rehearsal for episode six of the show, Drake Bell attempted a dive he had not previously practiced and got a concussion as well as two black eyes.
 Nicole Eggert fell on her back during her final dive on May 7. She was okay, but ended up losing to Rory Bushfield.

Scoring chart

Red numbers indicate the lowest score for each week
Green numbers indicate the highest score for each week
 The diver won the competition.
 The diver received second place in the competition.
 The diver received third place in the competition.
 The diver received first place that week, when audience scores were added in.
 The diver was eliminated that week.
 The diver was in the bottom two and competed in the dive-off.
 The diver withdrew from the competition.
 The diver did not dive that week.
 The contestant was not on the show at this time.
 The contestant was re-instated into the competition and withdrew in the same episode.

Averages

Live show details

Week 1
Running order

Week 2
Running order

Week 3
Running order

The challenge this week was to do a dive with a partner. Kendra Wilkinson withdrew from the competition due to personal reasons prior to Week 4's start. She was taped for Week 3 preparing for the dive, but she didn't dive in the live show, thus eliminating her directly.

Week 4
Running order

The challenge this week was to do a flip.

Week 5
Running order

The challenge this week was to jump off the 10 meter platform.

Week 6
Running order

The challenge this week was to jump in synchronization with a junior diving champ.

Week 7
Running order
The challenge this week was for each diver to choose which board to jump from and be given their dive by Greg.

Week 8
Running order

References

External links 
 
 

2010s American reality television series
2013 American television series debuts
2013 American television series endings
American Broadcasting Company original programming
American television series based on Dutch television series
English-language television shows
Television shows filmed in California